Dato' Azimi Daim is a Malaysian politician who served as Member of the Kedah State Executive Council (EXCO) in the Barisan Nasional (BN) state administration under former Menteris Besar Syed Razak Syed Zain Barakbah and Mahdzir Khalid and Member of the Kedah State Legislative Assembly (MLA) for Bandar Baharu from March 2004 to March 2008. He is a member of the Homeland Fighters' Party (PEJUANG) and was a member of the Malaysian United Indigenous Party (BERSATU), a component party of the ruling Perikatan Nasional (PN) and formerly Pakatan Harapan (PH) coalitions and the	United Malays National Organisation (UMNO), a component party of the ruling BN coalition. He served as Deputy Permanent Chairman of BERSATU from December 2017 to August 2020.  
 
Azimi was born on 22 April 1964 in Sungai Petani, Kedah. He graduated from Universiti Teknologi MARA and also studied at University of Hartford.

Before joining BERSATU at its inception in 2016, Azimi was a Supreme Council Member (2000-2003) and Information Chief of the Youth wing of the United Malays National Organisation (UMNO). He was formerly the Political Secretary of the Kedah Menteri Besar and Kedah state executive councillors. He was also the former Kedah State Legislative Assemblyman for Bandar Baharu from 2004 to 2008.He was appointed as the Deputy Permanent Chairman of BERSATU during the party General Assembly at Shah Alam on 30 December 2017.

Controversy
In 2006, together with Hashim Suboh and Hasnoor Hussein, he was officially reprimanded by UMNO for stating that "when tension rises, the blood of Malay warriors will run in our veins", which the opposition Democratic Action Party (DAP) had alleged was seditious. This was reportedly the first time UMNO leaders had been reprimanded for the content of their speeches. Azimi said:

Azimi blamed the opposition parties of the DAP and People's Justice Party (Keadilan) for blowing the issue out of proportion.

Election results

Honours
  :
  Companion Class I of the Exalted Order of Malacca (DMSM) - Datuk (2003)
  :
  Knight Companion of the Order of Loyalty to the Royal House of Kedah (DSDK) - Dato’ (2006)

Notes and references

Living people
1964 births
People from Kedah
Malaysian people of Malay descent
Malaysian Muslims
Former Malaysian United Indigenous Party politicians
Former United Malays National Organisation politicians
Members of the Kedah State Legislative Assembly
Kedah state executive councillors